Igor Leonidovich Mangushev (16 August 1986 – 8 February 2023), also known by his radio call sign Bereg, was a Russian mercenary and political advisor.

Born in Moscow during the dissolution of the Soviet Union, Mangushev grew up harboring Russian nationalist views. In 2009, he founded the nationalist organization Svetlaya Rus in 2009 and subsequently established E.N.O.T. Corp., a private military company. During the Russian invasion of Ukraine, Mangushev served as an officer in an anti-drone warfare platoon. In a speech given by Mangushev in 2022, during which he held a skull that he claimed was from a Ukrainian soldier killed during the siege of Mariupol, he outlined his rationale for the Russo-Ukrainian War; Mangushev sought to destroy Ukrainian national identity and terminate the existence of Ukraine as a sovereign state. In addition to his military activities, he worked as a political operative for various Kremlin agencies and an internet troll for the Internet Research Agency.

On 4 February 2023, Mangushev was shot in the back of the head while in the Luhansk Oblast. He succumbed to his injuries on 8 February while in a hospital. His widow has called for an investigation into his death, describing his killing as an assassination and alleging that medical care was inappropriately withheld from her husband in the days before his death.

Early life

Igor Mangushev was born on 16 August 1986 in Moscow, Russian SFSR.

As an adult, Mangushev was a Russian nationalist who founded the organization Svetlaya Rus in late 2009. Membership in the group was initially drawn from the Russian Orthodox Church-aligned Narodny Sobor movement, as well as various Russian patriotic movements. Mangushev, in his role leading Svetlaya Rus, coordinated with police and conducted raids on illegal migrants living within unlicensed dwellings in the Russian Federation; several members in the group were former law enforcement officials or had otherwise become connected with Russia's Federal Migration Service. Following the raids on immigrant dwellings, Mangushev would contact local Russian police, who would take note of the illegal migrants, fingerprint them, and typically release them. His group was among the first such public-private partnerships in Russia to conduct these sorts of operations following the 2011 arrest of Russian pilots in Tajikistan.   
	
By 2012, Mangushev's connections with militarizing patriotic groups in Russia had strengthened, and he founded and took the helm of E.N.O.T., which was founded to coordinate Russia's nascent militarized patriotic movement. That year, the group provided military training at a gathering of right-wing militiamen to over 450 individuals, earning  ($ international dollars in 2012) over the course of the three-day event.

According to documents leaked by Anonymous, Mangushev had become an employee of the Internet Research Agency by 2013. Kommersant reported in 2015 that Mangushev had written strategic analyzes for various Russian government agencies prior to the 2014 onset of the Russo-Ukrainian War. He publicly spoke about his work as an internet troll, stating that he had written messages online both in favor and in opposition to 2013 Alexei Navalny mayoral campaign as a part of his work.

Military career and mercenary work
Mangushev worked as captain in the Luhansk People's Militia, and as a mercenary. Through E.N.O.T. Corp., he deployed as a fighter in the Russo-Ukrainian War beginning in 2014, though E.N.O.T. had claimed at the time that it was simply providing humanitarian assistance to individuals living in Donbas. Mangushev was an active proponent of the formation and use of private military companies in the war, seeing them as a way to unify the citizens' militias with a more structured organization that could provide documentation of the militia's military activities. 

During the 2022 Russian invasion of Ukraine, Mangushev led Russia's anti-drone platoon, used the call sign Bereg. The platoon sought out and destroyed Ukrainian drones by identifying and interrupting their WiFi signals with technology developed by Mangushev and his team.

Mangushev also worked as a political strategist for mercenary company owner Yevgeny Prigozhin. The strategy work included disinformation efforts, and the organization of agent provocateurs to work against Lyubov Sobol during the 2019 Moscow City Duma election. He claimed to be the inventor of the Z symbol, and was a vocal proponent of the war, and critic of some Russian military leaders who he perceived as hesitant and making slow progress in the war. He was often photographed posing with a Nazi salute. He operated the Telegram channel Notes of an Adventurer.

In August 2022, a video circulated showing him appearing on a stage in a Russian nightclub, holding a skull that he claimed was from a Ukrainian soldier who died in the Azovstal Iron and Steel Works during the siege of Mariupol. While on stage with the skull, he performed a comedy routine, during which he stated that he sought the destruction of Ukraine as a nation-state and that Russia's goal in the invasion of Ukraine was to destroy the Ukrainian national identity.

Shooting, death, and aftermath 
On the night of 4 February 2023, at a checkpoint in Kadiivka, Mangushev was shot in the back of the head. At the time, he had been stationed in Kadiivka as a soldier in the Russo-Ukrainian War. He was struck by a 9mm bullet at close range, and afterwards was taken to a hospital in Kadiivka. He died in the hospital on 8 February 2023, aged 36.

His wife described his death as an execution, and his friends have called for an official investigation into his death. British political scientist Mark Galeotti described the shooting as a "hit", while Mangushev's widow alleged that medical care was being intentionally withheld from her husband in the days between the shooting and his death.

See also 
 Wagner Group

References 

1986 births
2023 deaths
Russian mercenaries
Russian military personnel killed in the 2022 Russian invasion of Ukraine
Deaths by firearm in Ukraine
People of the Luhansk People's Republic
Russian neo-Nazis
Russian nationalists
Anti-Ukrainian sentiment
Igor Mangushev
Internet trolls